Smokey Haangala (16th January 1950 - 16th August 1988), born Edwin Haakulipa Haangala, was a Zambian poet, writer, composer, musician and journalist. He rose to the top of the Zambian music scene in the 1970s and 1980s and was most famous for his keyboard playing. His most popular songs include Baala Ng'ombe, Kavundula, Mandalena Kasama, Bo Lisabet Wa Matambula and Mandalena Mongu. His music has been classified as Zamrock. His father, Cosmas Haangala, worked as a teacher, and his mother Agnes Chona was a housewife who also taught domestic science.

He won an award for best soloist in 1977 and 1978.

He also worked as a columnist or journalist with several periodicals, including the Times of Zambia, Weekend World, and Zambia Daily Mail before leaving to focus on his music.

Discography

Studio albums
 Aunka Ma Kwacha 
 Waunka Mooye

Compiled Albums
 Zambian Legends

Selected Singles
 Sinzala
 Mwambile
 Sticking

See also 

 Music of Zambia

References

External links 
Smokey Haangala
 Smokey Haangal Remembered
Last FM Smokey Haangala

1950 births
1988 deaths
20th-century Zambian male singers